Thickfreakness is the second studio album by American rock duo The Black Keys, released in 2003. It is their debut release for the Fat Possum record label, although in the UK and Europe it was co-released by Epitaph Records.

Background
The band's debut album The Big Come Up had been tremendously successful for an independent rock band and Thickfreakness further increased their profile. It continues The Black Keys' tradition of raw, heavy blues-influenced garage rock.

Songs such as "Set You Free" won the pair some mainstream success as being featured in the soundtrack of the 2003 film School of Rock. Heavy comparisons to another American blues-influenced garage rock duo, The White Stripes, were often made by the music media.

Recording
Most of the album was recorded in December 2002 during a single 14-hour session in Patrick Carney's basement using an early 1980s Tascam 388 8-track recorder. This approach was necessary because the group spent its small advance payment from Fat Possum Records on rent. The liner notes claim this is Carney's "patented recording technique called 'medium fidelity'". The result is a more vintage sound. The song "Midnight in Her Eyes" is one of the few Black Keys songs that used a bass guitar; Dan Auerbach dubbed a bassline by playing a Guild SG-style bass through a guitar amp into the song. Part of "Set You Free" was recorded by Jeff Saltzman.

The album included two covers: "Have Love, Will Travel" by Richard Berry and "Everywhere I Go" by north Mississippi bluesman Junior Kimbrough.

Artwork
The cover art was  made by Carney's brother Michael, who was responsible for the whole graphical process after the layout of The Big Come Up ended up done by Patrick Boissel of Alive Records. As the Carneys drove around Akron trying to think of an idea, they ended up in a  Super K-Mart and eventually found a concept upon finding a can of pomade. Then they moved all of the lamps in his house into one room to light up the picture, where Patrick handled the pomade.

Reception

Thickfreakness was The Black Keys' first breakthrough album, as it established them as an indie-rock blues band. Their recognition from Thickfreakness led them on a rigorous tour schedule including opening for singer/songwriter Beck (on his Sea Change summer tour) in the summer of 2003. According to The Boston Globe, "Thickfreakness is an album that's meant to be felt as much as heard, rigged with plunging riffs, Auerbach's charcoal-smoke singing voice, and rhythmic pockets as deep as quicksand". It was during this time that Auerbach began writing material for their next album. When the two returned from touring, Auerbach's landlord had sold his house where the duo wrote Thickfreakness in the basement.

Track listing

Personnel
Dan Auerbach - guitar, vocals, bass
Patrick Carney - drums, percussion, production

References

The Black Keys albums
2003 albums
Fat Possum Records albums
Albums produced by Patrick Carney
Albums recorded in a home studio